Simian Conquest is a role-playing game published by Avant-Garde Simulations Perspectives in 1978.

Description
Simian Conquest is a science fiction role-playing system. The brief rules cover ape, human, mutant, and astronaut characters as well as combat and campaigning in the world of the Apes.

Publication history
Simian Conquest was designed by Marshall Rose and Norman Knight, and published by Avant-Garde Simulations Perspectives (ASP) in 1978 as a 32-page digest-sized book. Gamescience had planned to re-release this as "Gorilla Warfare", but never published it.

Reception
Lawrence Schick noted that the game was "inspired by the Planet of the Apes series".

References

Role-playing games introduced in 1978
Science fiction role-playing games